Lee Ji-Yong is a South Korean professional footballer who plays as a forward for Malaysia Super League club Sri Pahang.

Career

Pohang Steelers

As a youth payer, Lee joined the youth academy of Pohang Steelers.

Soongsil University

After that, he played for Soongsil University.

Pohang Steelers

Lee started his career with Pohang Steelers, and was part of the squad that reached the 2022 AFC Champions League final.

Sri Pahang

Before the 2023 season, he signed for Sri Pahang.

References

1999 births
Living people